Rodzilla may refer to:

Nickname of Rodney Blake (born 1983), Tonga-born professional Australian rugby union footballer
Nickname of Dennis Rodman (born 1961), former NBA player